On 5 June 2022, Brazilian indigenist Bruno Pereira and British journalist Dom Phillips were murdered during a boat trip through the Vale do Javari, the second-largest indigenous area in Brazil. 

Two brothers were arrested by the Federal Police for suspected involvement in the murders. A few days later, one of them confessed to the killings, and told the police where he had buried the bodies as well as the location of the boat they used. The forensics investigation concluded the recognition of the bodies on 22 June. Philips' body was cremated in Niteroi in a ceremony reserved for family and close friends. Pereira's body was cremated in the city of Paulista in a ceremony that featured indigenous rituals.

Background 
On 5 June 2022, Bruno Pereira and Dom Phillips arrived at Lago do Jaburu, a location near the National Indian Foundation Surveillance Base on the Ituí River, for Phillips to visit the site and conduct interviews with indigenous people. Two days later, they both went to the São Rafael community, where they were to hold a meeting with a local fisherman nicknamed "Churrasco." The meeting aimed to discuss joint work between riverine and indigenous people in the surveillance of the Javari Valley, a territory badly affected by invasions and criminal activities. However, the fisherman was not there, so they talked to his wife. Pereira and Phillips disappeared while traveling along the Itaguaí River towards the municipality of Atalaia do Norte.

Victims

Bruno Pereira 
Bruno Pereira was born in the city of Recife, in Pernambuco, on 15 August 1980. He was an indigenist and career servant of Funai, having been considered one of the country's leading experts on isolated or recently-contacted indigenous people. In 2019, he led the largest expedition to contact isolated indigenous peoples in 20 years. However, under pressure from ruralist sectors linked to the government of Jair Bolsonaro, he was dismissed from his post in October of that year by Sergio Moro's then-executive secretary at the Ministry of Justice, Luiz Pontel. According to indigenous entities, Pereira was constantly threatened by gold miners and fishermen.

Dom Phillips 

Dom Phillips was born in the United Kingdom and worked as a freelance journalist, contributing to the Financial Times, The Guardian, The New York Times, and The Washington Post. He moved to Brazil in 2007 and lived in Salvador. He was married to Brazilian Alessandra Sampaio and was writing a book about the Amazon rainforest and its sustainable potential.

Criminal prosecution

Investigations 
On 5 June, the Union of Indigenous Organizations of the Javari Valley (Univaja) organized two search teams that left Atalaia do Norte and Tabatinga. Without success, it released a note on its social networks denouncing the disappearance and asking for efforts in the search. For its part, the Federal Police announced that they were investigating the event but gave no further details.

On 7 June, the Military Police searched the residence of Amarildo da Costa de Oliveira, known as "Pelado," after receiving an anonymous tip about his supposed participation in the disappearance. He was arrested for possession of drugs and unauthorized possession of restricted ammunition. At the time, the police seized the suspect's speedboat, where traces of blood were found and sent for analysis. On 12 June, the firefighters' team in Atalaia do Norte found a backpack, a laptop, and a pair of sandals near Amarildo's house. The following day, Dom Phillips' family was wrongly informed by the Brazilian Embassy in the United Kingdom that the bodies had been found.

On 15 June, Amarildo confessed his participation in the crime and indicated to the authorities where he had buried the bodies as well as the place where Pereira and Phillips' boat sank. The Federal Police found human remains at the indicated location and did not rule out further arrests. The day before the confession, Amarildo's brother, Oseney da Costa de Oliveira, was arrested.

On 18 June, police arrested a third suspect in the killings, Jefferson da Silva Lima.

Criminal Procedure 
On 21 July 2022, the Public Prosecutor's Office charged three people for the murder of Philips and Pereira and the concealment of the bodies. The accusation was filed in the Federal Court of the town of Tabatinga, in Amazonas state. According to the prosecutors, Pereira was killed with three shots, one of them in the back, while Phillips was murdered only because he accompanied Pereira at the time the crime was committed.

Aftermath 
The case had vast repercussions in Brazil, international media, mobilized societies, and trade associations. The federal government has been criticized for not taking sufficient search measures and weakening institutions designed to protect the environment.

International press 
Press coverage that increased since the beginning of the case gained international traction. The Guardian, a newspaper for whom Dom Phillips had written, stated there was "growing fear about the safety of the two men, who disappeared in the forest days after receiving threats." BBC News has covered what it termed Phillips' "family and friends demand[ing] answers." The New York Times and The Washington Post drew attention to the delay in sending helicopters to scour the dense vegetation.

See also 
List of solved missing person cases

References

2022 murders in Brazil
June 2022 events in Brazil
June 2022 crimes in South America
2020s missing person cases
Pereira, Bruno, Phillips, Dom
Deaths in Amazonas (Brazilian state)
History of Amazonas (Brazilian state)
Human rights in Brazil
Missing person cases in Brazil
Brazil–United Kingdom relations